Josemar Tiago Machaísse (born 7 August 1987) is Mozambican footballer who plays for F.C. Bravos do Maquis in Angola as a midfielder. He is a member of Mozambique national football team.

References

External links 

Living people
1987 births
Sportspeople from Maputo
Mozambican footballers
Mozambique international footballers
Association football midfielders
GD Maputo players
CD Costa do Sol players
C.D. Maxaquene players
Liga Desportiva de Maputo players
F.C. Bravos do Maquis players
Clube Ferroviário de Nampula players
Mozambican expatriate footballers
Expatriate footballers in Angola
2010 Africa Cup of Nations players
2014 African Nations Championship players
Mozambique A' international footballers